Polycarpaea paulayana is a species of plant in the family Caryophyllaceae. It is endemic to Yemen.  Its natural habitat is subtropical or tropical dry shrubland.

References

Endemic flora of Socotra
paulayana
Vulnerable plants
Taxonomy articles created by Polbot